The European Day of Radiology (EDoR) is an annual day of action that will take place for the first time on February 10, 2011. The day is an initiative of the European Society of Radiology, an organisation that represents the interests of radiology and its practitioners throughout Europe and also hosts the European Congress of Radiology.

History 
The European Day of Radiology will be held for the first time on February 10, 2011, in honour of the anniversary of the death of Wilhelm Conrad Röntgen, who first discovered x-rays.
The goal of the EDoR is to celebrate the achievements and benefits of radiology from its beginnings up to the present day and to raise public awareness.

Participating countries 
National radiological societies from Austria, Belgium, the Czech Republic, Croatia, France, Georgia, Hungary, Ireland, Italy, Lithuania, the Netherlands, Poland, Portugal, Romania, Spain, Sweden, Switzerland, Turkey and the United Kingdom are taking part in this initiative.

The EDoR in English speaking countries 
In Ireland, the First European Day of Radiology will be celebrated by the Faculty of Radiologists, Royal college of Surgeons, and in the UK by the Royal College of Radiologists.

International Day of Radiology (IDoR)
The International Day of Radiology is the successor to the European Day of Radiology which was established in 2011. The first and only European Day of Radiology was held on February 10, 2011, to commemorate the anniversary of Röntgen's death.

External links
 European Day of Radiology -Homepage
 European Hospital
 WCR-News
 Royal College of Radiologists

References 

Annual events in Europe
International observances
Observances about science
Radiology